The 2010 Eastern Washington Eagles football team represented Eastern Washington University in the 2010 NCAA Division I FCS football season. The team was coached by Beau Baldwin and played their home games at Roos Field in Cheney, Washington.

The football team competed as a member of the Big Sky Conference. The Eagles won the NCAA Division I FCS National Championship and claimed a share of the Big Sky Conference championship with Montana State

Schedule

Coaching staff

Awards and honors
 Big Sky Conference Co-Offensive Player of the Year (coaches and media) — Taiwan Jones
 Big Sky Conference Defensive Player of the Year (coaches and media) — J. C. Sherritt
 Buck Buchanan Award — J. C. Sherritt

References

Eastern Washington
Eastern Washington Eagles football seasons
Eastern Washington
NCAA Division I Football Champions
Big Sky Conference football champion seasons
Eastern Washington Eagles football